Simojärvi is a medium-sized lake of Finland located in Ranua, in the region of Lapland. It belongs to Simojoki main catchment area.

See also
List of lakes in Finland

References

External links

Simojoki basin
Landforms of Lapland (Finland)
Lakes of Ranua